Jad Capelja (1964 – 10 January 2010) was an Australian actress best known for her role in the 1981 teen film Puberty Blues, based on the novel of the same name. 

In Puberty Blues Capelja played Sue, best friend to the lead character Debbie played by Nell Schofield. The film was very successful in Australia, Schofield and Capelja became instant stars and were sent on a huge publicity tour around the country.

Capelja was later the female lead in Scott Hicks' 1982 road film Freedom and acted in two episodes of TV drama series A Country Practice in 1982. These two performances and Puberty Blues are her only credited roles.

Capelja, born to Czechoslovakian parents, tried to continue her performing career by auditioning for other acting roles and for the National Institute of Dramatic Art, all without success. She later struggled with addiction and was diagnosed with paranoid schizophrenia.

Capelja committed suicide on 10 January 2010. Her Puberty Blues co-star Nell Schofield later observed that "it was probably very hard for her to accept that she wasn't going to have a career as an actress, that she wasn't going to be as famous or as big a star as she was when she was 16." 

She had a son, Miles Muecke, from her marriage to Richard Muecke. Capelja's family now lives in Serbia.

References

External links
 

Australian film actresses
Actresses from Sydney
1964 births
2010 deaths
Australian people of Czech descent